To mark the Queen's Platinum Jubilee, lieutenant governors and territorial commissioners across Canada dedicate gardens in their respective province/territory. Each of the 13 gardens included plants suited to the local climate. Tobacco was also included where climate and protocols allow, providing the gardens with a representation of the relationship between the Crown and Indigenous peoples of Canada through its treaties. Tobacco seeds were provided to vice-regal offices from plants grown for the Chapel Royal at Massey College.

New Brunswick 

The Platinum Jubilee Garden in New Brunswick was officially opened on June 26, in the grounds of Government House in Fredericton.

Lieutenant Governor Brenda Murphy said that the garden "will serve as a living tribute to Her Majesty where New Brunswickers can reflect upon her unprecedented reign".

Nunavut 

The Platinum Jubilee Garden in Nunavut was dedicated by Commissioner Eva Qamaniq Aariak at the Legislative Building of Nunavut in Iqaluit on July 9.

The flower boxes on the grounds of the assembly contain local wildflowers. Aariak called them "a living tribute to Her Majesty, who has reigned with dignity, respect, and caring compassion".

Ontario

The Ontario Platinum Jubilee Garden will be planted on the grounds of the Ontario Legislative Building in Toronto.

It will be designed in partnership with Elder Carolyn King of the Mississaugas of the Credit First Nation, and the garden will have a special focus on the relationship between the Crown and Indigenous Peoples by featuring tobacco plants.

Prince Edward Island 

Prince Edward Island's Platinum Jubilee Garden was unveiled by Lieutenant Governor Antoinette Perry at Government House in Charlottetown on June 2, 2022.

The garden includes a special tulip created for the Queen's Diamond Jubilee in 2012, plants native to the island, flowers representing the first groups to settle in the provincelavender for the English and French, and thistle for the Scottish and Irish. Ceremonial tobacco was also included to honour the Mi'kmaq people.

Lieutenant Governor Antoinette Perry, who personally oversaw the garden's design, said she was "so happy to have honoured Her Majesty's Platinum Jubilee in this way... I can just see her sitting on the bench admiring the beauty of this garden and treasuring it, because she does love Prince Edward Island. I know that, she told me that".

Saskatchewan 

Saskatchewan's Platinum Jubilee garden was unveiled by Lieutenant Governor Russ Mirasty at Government House, Regina. The dedication ceremony took place in the Edwardian Gardens on the northwest lawn of Government House on July 19, 2022, when Mirasty ceremonially planted a tobacco plant and welcomed all in attendance to the newly opened gardens.

The garden design features the Queen Elizabeth rose in the centre. It also recognises the ties between the Crown and Indigenous peoples by including tobacco plants, and it commemorates Saskatchewan with plants native to the province.

The Provincial Capital Commission (PCC) staff and members of the Heritage Conservation Branch of the Ministry of Parks, Culture and Sport helped develop the garden.

Yukon 

In Yukon, the Platinum Jubilee Garden was unveiled at Taylor House on June 22, in partnership with Kwanlin Dün First Nation and Ta'an Kwäch'än Council.

References

 
Monarchy in Canada
2022 in Canada